Campylobacter rectus is a species of Campylobacter. It is implicated as a pathogen in chronic periodontitis, which can induce bone loss. This motile bacillus is a Gram negative, facultative anaerobe. C. rectus is associated with hypertension together with Prevotella melaninogenica and Veillonella parvula.

References

Further reading

External links
Type strain of Campylobacter rectus at BacDive -  the Bacterial Diversity Metadatabase

Campylobacterota
Bacteria described in 1991